Izak Benbasat  is a Turkish–Canadian professor and scientist, currently the Sauder Distinguished Professor of Information Systems and professor of information-system management at the University of British Columbia Sauder School of Business. He is also a published author, being largely cited as a researcher.

References

Canadian people of Turkish descent
Academic staff of the UBC Sauder School of Business
Year of birth missing (living people)
Living people
Scientists from Vancouver
Canadian management scientists
Canadian computer scientists
20th-century Canadian scientists
21st-century Canadian scientists
Members of the Order of Canada
Information systems researchers